Country Life may refer to:

 Rural lifestyle

Literature 
 Country Life (books), publications compiled from the articles and photographic archives of Country Life magazine
 Country Life (magazine), a British weekly magazine
 Country Life in America, later renamed Country Life, an American magazine
 The Country Life, a 1997 novel by Rachel Cusk
 Country Life, a 1978 poetry collection by Peter Ackroyd

Music 
 Country Life (Roxy Music album), 1974
 Country Life (Show of Hands album), 2003

Other uses
 Country Life (film), a 1994 Australian film
 Country Life, a UK brand of butter and milk owned by Saputo Dairy UK
 Country life movement, a 20th-century American social movement

See also